These hits topped the Dutch Top 40 in 1987.

See also
1987 in music

References

1987 in the Netherlands
1987 record charts
1987